Albanian Rugby League (ARL) represents Albania in international rugby league tournaments, as well as organizes domestic competitions, and undertakes development projects. Rugby league is a new sport in Albania, which has been officially registered since 2017. The popularity of rugby league is struggling for attention in the national media. However, since the creation of the ARL national team and the introduction of Tirana Rugby Club (founded in 2013) in the Greek championship, coverage has increased with articles appearing in different rugby league official forums and newspapers.

History 
Although not formal at the time, the first steps of this non-profit organization were made back in 2010. Initially, a rugby union team (Tirana RC) was founded by two pupils of a central high-school in the city of Tirana. Facing difficulties in recruiting new players, due to the high number of players required in a rugby union game, a switch from rugby union to rugby league ensued in 2017. In 2018 as part of the festival of rugby league surrounding the U19 European Championships in Belgrade, the Albania National Team also participated in the 9s tournament. In 2018 Albanian Rugby League was also granted the observer status, becoming the 39th member nation of RLEF.  In 2019 the ARL played against GB Pioneers, a team consisting of students from top universities across Great Britain and Northern Ireland.

Rugby League Clubs in Albania

 Tirana Rugby Club (Tirana Regbi Klub)
 Illyrians Rugby Club (Iliret Regbi Klub)

Governing Body 
Albanian Rugby League is the governing body in rugby league in Albania, managing development and participation at all levels in the sport.

Competitions 
Since the creation of the ARL, the team has taken part in a few competitions in the Balkans.

2018 Belgrade (9s)

2019 Tirana - Albania

The National Team

Coaching Team

Results

References 

Rugby league in Albania
2017 establishments in Albania
Rugby League